Stratosphere is the second studio album by American singer-songwriter and drummer Matt Sorum. Credited to "Matt Sorum's Fierce Joy", it was released in 2014 and contains tracks in a variety of styles.  AllMusic reviewer John Christopher Monger rated the album 4 stars out of 5 and described it as "a big, dusty, vintage blast of open-road classic rock, breezy singer/songwriter folk-pop, and occasionally lavish chamber/psych rock".

Track listing
All lyrics written by Matt Sorum

References

2014 albums
Matt Sorum albums